The 1993–94 Taça de Portugal was the 55th edition of the Portuguese football knockout tournament, organized by the Portuguese Football Federation (FPF). The 1993–94 Taça de Portugal began in September 1993. The final was played on 5 June 1994 at the Estádio Nacional.

Benfica were the previous holders, having defeated Boavista 5–2 in the previous season's final. Cup holders Benfica were eliminated in the sixth round by Belenenses. Porto defeated Sporting CP, 2–1 in a final that went to a replay as the inaugural match ended goalless. Porto's cup triumph would claim them an eighth Taça de Portugal. As a result of Porto winning the domestic cup competition, the Portistas faced 1993–94 Primeira Divisão winners Benfica in the 1994 Supertaça Cândido de Oliveira.

Sixth round
Ties were played on the 30 January. Due to the odd number of teams involved at this stage of the competition, Desportivo das Aves qualified for the quarter-finals due to having no opponent to face at this stage of the competition.

Quarter-finals
Ties were played on the 15 February.

Semi-finals
Ties were played on 2 April.

Final

Replay

References

Taça de Portugal seasons
Taca De Portugal, 1993-94
1993–94 domestic association football cups